Batman/Houdini: The Devil's Workshop is a 1993 Elseworlds one-shot, written by Howard Chaykin and John Francis Moore. Containing full-painted art by Mark Chiarello, the story recounts a fictional encounter between the superhero Batman and famous escape artist Harry Houdini in early 20th century Gotham.

Characters

Bruce Wayne/Batman
Harry Houdini
Victoria Vale, a reporter
Jack Schadenfreude
Elijah Montenegro, the Beef Baron
Leonora Reinhardt, an actress and medium
Tom Mix

Plot
In the Winter of 1907, children are disappearing from the impoverished part of Gotham, known as the "Devil's Workshop". The criminal is a grinning white-faced ghoul named Jack Schadenfreude.
 
Meanwhile, Harry Houdini is in town for a performance and mingles with Gotham's elite. Amongst them is Bruce Wayne, from an old money background, and Elijah Montenegro, the nouveau riche, self-styled "Beef Baron". Also in town are other notables, specifically Tom Mix and Leonora Reinhardt. All the high society events are being documented for the Gotham Globe by Victoria Vale.

Vale and Wayne attend Reinhardt's performance as the lead in Medea, where they meet the Baron again. They are then invited into a séance held by Reinhardt. An invitation also extended to Houdini, who has an interest in the paranormal. The séance is apparently a success, leading the three to conclude something genuinely supernatural is going on.

The abductions are traced to Montenegro's meat factory and it soon becomes apparent that everything is somehow connected.

The story is narrated by Houdini. He contrasts his own poor upbringing with that of Bruce Wayne. It also highlights Batman, as he learns a number of his skills from studying Houdini's work.

Publication
The story was published as a 64-page, prestige format one-shot by DC Comics.

Awards
 1993: Won "Best Graphic Novel" Don Thompson Award
 1994:
 Nominated for "Best Painter" Eisner Award, for Mark Chiarello
 Nominated for "Best Letterer" Eisner Award, for Ken Bruzenak

See also
List of Elseworlds publications

Notes

References

 

Elseworlds titles
Batman titles
Comics by Howard Chaykin
DC Comics one-shots
Fiction set in 1907